Paul David Magriel Jr. (pronounced Ma-grill) (July 1, 1946 – March 5, 2018) was an American professional backgammon player, poker player, and author based in Las Vegas, Nevada.

Magriel became New York State Junior Chess Champion (January 1967) at the age of 20, while a student at New York University.

Backgammon
Known as X-22 on the backgammon circuit, Magriel arguably won more major backgammon tournaments than any other player in the world.  He was widely considered the world's premier backgammon teacher, an original and clear-thinking theorist and one of its best players.

The sobriquet X-22 originates from Magriel's simulation of a real backgammon tournament (compare simultaneous exhibition in chess) with 64 boards, designated X-1 through X-64, in which the player designated "X-22" has eventually won.

Magriel first came to prominence on the backgammon circuit when he won the World Backgammon Championship in 1978.  From 1977 to 1980, he wrote weekly backgammon columns for The New York Times.

Paul and Renée Magriel (his first wife, later Roberts) wrote two books, Backgammon, widely considered to be the bible of the game, and an abridgement for beginning players, An Introduction to Backgammon: A Step-by-Step Guide.

Magriel was featured in the commentary in the televised backgammon series, High Stakes Backgammon, produced from the 2005 World Backgammon Championships held in Monte Carlo. It was the pilot series that led to the World Series of Backgammon and showcased Magriel's oratory skills.

Poker
Magriel had several notable finishes in poker tournaments from the mid-1990s in Europe, playing in London, Paris and Vienna in Omaha, hold'em and seven-card stud events. He won the €2,000 no limit hold'em event at the Aviation Club de France in September 2002, defeating a field including Pascal "Triple P" Perrault, Patrick Bruel and Simon "Aces" Trumper on the way to the €48,600 first prize.

In March 2003, he made his first World Poker Tour (WPT) final table, finishing 4th in the $5,000 no limit hold'em World Poker Challenge event in Reno.

Magriel finished in the money eight times at the World Series of Poker (WSOP), which includes one cash in the Main Event in 2010, he has also made the final table on the Professional Poker Tour and Ultimate Poker Challenge.

Magriel created the "M Principle" (better known since as the M-ratio) - a theory elaborated on at great length in the book Harrington on Hold'em Volume II by former WSOP Champion "Action" Dan Harrington and Bill Robertie. The theory explains at which stages of tournaments expected value exists to make moves on other players, depending on the ratio between chip stack sizes and antes.

While playing poker, Magriel often shouted "Quack quack!"  while making a bet, usually to declare a bet which had a numerical value beginning in 22 (e.g.: 2200, 22000.) This is a reference to his nickname, X-22, since a pair of 2's are known in backgammon as "double ducks" and poker as ducks.

His total live poker tournament winnings exceed $520,000.

Family and miscellaneous
Magriel was the son of Paul David Magriel, Sr. (1906–1990), an art collector and author, and Christine Fairchild Magriel, an architect.  His younger half-brother is the sarangi player and teacher Nicolas Magriel. He has one son, Louis Fairchild Magriel (Louis being the name of all four grandfathers) by his third ex-wife, French poker player Martine Oulés

After receiving perfect College Board scores, he became, while an undergraduate, a fellow of the Courant Institute at New York University and later a National Science Foundation fellow at Princeton University with a primary interest in probability.

Magriel taught mathematics at the Newark College of Engineering (now New Jersey Institute of Technology) between 1969 and 1973.

References

External links
 
 Paul David Magriel, 1906– (father) at LC Authorities with 18 records
 Renée Magriel Roberts (first wife) at LC Authorities with 1 record

1946 births
2018 deaths
American poker players
American backgammon players
New Jersey Institute of Technology faculty
New York University alumni
Princeton University alumni
People from Manhattan